Ricardo N. Arroyo is an American lawyer and politician from the state of Massachusetts. He is currently a member of the Boston City Council.

Biography
Arroyo first ran for a seat on the Boston City Council in 2019; at the time, he was working as a public defender. He successfully won the District 5 (Hyde Park and Roslindale) seat on the council in the November 2019 election, took office in January 2020, and was re-elected in the November 2021 election.

In early February 2022, Arroyo announced his candidacy for the position of district attorney (DA) of Suffolk County (Boston, Chelsea, Revere, and Winthrop), Massachusetts. The position had previously been held by Rachael Rollins, prior to her appointment as United States Attorney for the District of Massachusetts. Kevin Hayden, appointed by Massachusetts governor Charlie Baker as interim DA, declared his candidacy shortly afterwards. Arroyo and Hayden both gained spots on the Democratic ballot in the primary election scheduled for September 6, 2022.

On August 23, 2022, The Boston Globe published an article regarding two instances of sexual assault reports involving Arroyo that were investigated by police in 2005 and 2007. Arroyo was not charged in either instance, and he denied the allegations reported by the Globe. An attorney, speaking at a news conference on behalf of the 2007 complainant, stated that Arroyo never assaulted her client. Further that the her client thought the Globe twisted her words. Arroyo stated that he was unaware of allegations until being informed by the Globe. He was required to disclose being the subject of any criminal investigation that he may have been aware of when applying for his law license in 2014. The report led to the withdrawal of some endorsements in his run for the Suffolk DA position. The president of the Boston City Council, Ed Flynn, also removed Arroyo from two committee chairmanships and from his position as vice president of the council. On August 30, the Globe published comments from an August 29 interview with the woman who accused Arroyo of assault in 2005—she stood by her accusations of coerced sex by Arroyo. The following day, Arroyo lost the support of senators Elizabeth Warren and Ed Markey and Boston mayor Michelle Wu, as they withdrew their endorsements of him for Suffolk DA.

Following the Democratic primary election held on September 6, and with results showing Hayden with a lead of approximately seven points (53.8% to 46.2%), Arroyo conceded the race via Twitter the following morning.

After the past sexual assault accusations surfaced, City Council President Ed Flynn suspended Arroyo from his city council committee chairmanships.

Personal life
Arroyo's father, Felix D. Arroyo, and brother, Felix G. Arroyo, both previously served on the Boston City Council as at-large members.

References

Living people
1980s births
American politicians of Puerto Rican descent
Year of birth missing (living people)
People from Hyde Park, Boston
Lawyers from Boston
Hispanic and Latino American city council members
Boston City Council members
Massachusetts Democrats
21st-century American politicians
Public defenders